Tokarz is a Polish surname. Notable people with this surname include:

 Jakub Tokarz (born 1981), Polish paracanoeist
 Leszek Tokarz (born 1983), Polish ice hockey player
 Wacław Tokarz (1873-1937), Polish historian
 Wiesław Tokarz (born 1951), Polish ice hockey player

See also
 

Polish-language surnames